Ronald Joseph Oscar Camille Crevier (born April 14, 1958) is a Canadian former professional basketball player.  He played part of one season in the National Basketball Association (NBA) and in the early 1980s for the Canadian national men's basketball team.

Born in Montreal, Quebec, Crevier played for Dawson College CEGEP before enrolling at Boston College, where during his four years he came off the bench for the Eagles.  Despite his limited playing time the 7-foot Crevier was drafted by the Chicago Bulls in the fourth round (75th pick overall) in the 1983 draft.  He did not make team however and played instead in the Continental Basketball Association for the Toronto Tornados, along with fellow Canadian Jim Zoet.

Crevier began the 1985–86 season playing for the Springfield Flame of the United States Basketball League, and posted the third most blocked shots in the league with 1.6 per game.  He joined the Golden State Warriors in mid-season and saw a minute of action in one game.  He later joined the Detroit Pistons, playing 3 minutes over two games.  Crevier then played the 1986–7 season for Pamesa Valencia in Spain.

See also 
List of Montreal athletes
FrozenHoops.com History of basketball in Canada. Selection of Top 100 Canadian players of all time.

External links 
Stats

1958 births
Living people
Anglophone Quebec people
Basketball players from Montreal
Boston College Eagles men's basketball players
Canadian expatriate basketball people in the United States
Canadian expatriate basketball people in Spain
Canadian men's basketball players
1982 FIBA World Championship players
Chicago Bulls draft picks
Dawson College alumni
Detroit Pistons players
Golden State Warriors players
Maine Windjammers players
National Basketball Association players from Canada
Toronto Tornados players
Valencia Basket players
Centers (basketball)